The State of Na (also written as 冉) was a minor state in Ancient China.

History
During the Zhou Dynasty in the 11th century BCE, the Duke of Zhou received orders from King Cheng of Zhou to announce an edict concerning descendants of the royal Ji (姬) family. The descendants were given land in the Shihui Bridge (拾回桥) area of Shayang County, where they established the State of Na (那国).

In 704 BCE King Wu of Chu conquered the State of Na (那国) and the  State of Quan (權國), annexing them both into the territory of the State of Chu.

See also
Duke of Zhou
King Cheng of Zhou
King Wu of Chu

Ancient Chinese states